Johann Friedrich Wilhelm von Bezold (June 21, 1837 – February 17, 1907) was a German physicist and meteorologist born in Munich, Kingdom of Bavaria. He is best known for discovering the Bezold effect and the Bezold–Brücke shift.

Bezold studied mathematics and physics at the University of Munich and the University of Göttingen. He taught meteorology in Munich from 1861, becoming a professor in 1866. In 1868 he began teaching at the Technical University of Munich. In 1875, he was named a member of the Bavarian Academy of Sciences.

From 1885 to 1907 director of the Prussian Institute of Meteorology at the University of Berlin. As a scientist, he was mainly interested in the physics of the atmosphere, and he contributed much to the theory of electrical storms.

Bezold was one of the early researchers of atmospheric thermodynamics. He considered pseudo-adiabatic processes describing air as it is lifted, expands, cools, and eventually condenses and precipitates its water vapor.

It was Bezold's investigations of Lichtenberg dust figures that were useful to Heinrich Rudolf Hertz during his attempt to physically validate Maxwell's mathematical analysis of electromagnetic waves.

References

W. von Bezold, Zur Thermodynamik der Atmosphäre. Pts. I, II. Sitz. K. Preuss. Akad. Wissensch. Berlin, pp. 485–522, 1189-1206; Gesammelte Abhandlugen, pp. 91–144. English translation by Abbe, C. The mechanics of the Earth's atmosphere. Smithsonian Miscellaneous Collections, no 843, 1893, 212-242.

External links
Wilhelm von Bezold (1876) The theory of color and its relation to art and art-industry... translated from the German by S. R. Koehler - digital facsimile from the Linda Hall Library

1837 births
1907 deaths
German meteorologists
German untitled nobility
19th-century German physicists
Scientists from Munich
People from the Kingdom of Bavaria
Ludwig Maximilian University of Munich alumni
Academic staff of the Ludwig Maximilian University of Munich
University of Göttingen alumni
Academic staff of the Technical University of Munich
Academic staff of the Humboldt University of Berlin
Members of the Göttingen Academy of Sciences and Humanities